Peter Nwangwu  is a Umuahia, Abia State  Igbo born man hailing from Anambra State, Nigeria. Peter Nwangwu, a professor of Pharmacology, Toxicology and Clinical Pharmacy, was the Vice Chancellor's Executive Assistance at University of Nigeria, Nsukka. In 2005, he was named the "Business Man of the Year 2005", by the Business Advisory Council of the United States, Washington alongside eleven other people selected or nominated for the award. In 2011, he became the African Democratic Congress, ADC' presidential candidate because according to him "Nigeria needs fine statesman, not politician".

References 

Living people
Year of birth missing (living people)
People from Anambra State
Igbo academics
African Democratic Congress politicians
Academic staff of the University of Nigeria